Maharani Kottai is a 2015 Indian Tamil-language horror comedy drama film written and directed by S. Vinod Kumar. The film features Richard and Annie Prince Nag in the lead roles, alongside Senthil and Ganesh. Produced by Thanamalar Creations, the film was released on 10 July 2015.

Cast 

 Richard
 Annie Prince Nag
 Senthil
 Ganesh
 Ganja Karuppu
 Powerstar Srinivasan
 Ashvin Raja
 Ashwini
 Velmurugan
 Bava Lakshmanan
 Vaiyapuri
 Thyagu
 Benjamin
 Nellai Siva
 Bonda Mani
 King Kong
 Sam Anderson
Neena Kurup

Production 
After making a Telugu film titled Win featuring Jai Akash, Vinod Kumar began making Maharani Kottai in Tamil and cast Richard and actress Annie Prince Nag in the lead roles. Annie had previously competed as a beauty pageant, and the film marked her acting debut. Veteran actors Senthil, Ganesh and Thyagu played supporting roles in the film. The film was produced by Singapore-based Subramaniam and Thanamalar as a joint venture for Dhanamalar Creations.

Soundtrack
The film's audio launch was hold on 20 September 2014. The soundtrack had songs composed by U. K. Murali.

Release and reception 
The film had a theatrical release across Tamil Nadu on 16 December 2016. A critic from Iflicks noted "director Vinothkumar has tried to give a horror movie that doesn’t create the expected impact except for the climax scene". A reviewer from Maalai Malar called the film "not scary" and gave the film a negative review. The reviewer from Dinamalar called the film "logic-less".

References

External links 

2010s Tamil-language films
2015 films
2015 comedy horror films
Indian comedy horror films